Desamorfosis (stylized as desAMORfosis) is the eighteenth studio album by Mexican singer Thalía. It was released on May 14, 2021, by Sony Music Latin.

The title is a blend of the Spanish words desamor (heartbreak) and metamorfosis (metamorphosis), with an emphasis on amor (love).

Production and release
The album was preceded by four singles including "Ya Tú Me Conoces"  released on all digital platforms on January 24, 2020, as the lead single. It marks the second time that Thalía has collaborated with Ricky Montaner, who wrote her 2014 single "Por Lo Que Reste De Vida", the second single released to anticipate the album was La Luz, a duet with Myke Towers released on August 28. The third single released was "Tick Tock" in which she sings with Farina and Sofía Reyes that peaked #9 on Billboard's Latin Pop Digital Songs Sales.

On May 4, 2021, the singer announced the release of the album for the next day 14, in her Instagram page, suggesting that fans to reserve the album on their favorite digital platforms in order to be the first to listen it and have exclusive access to the "Universo desAMORfosis" website where they would find exclusive content and surprises. She also posted the album cover which she appear showing her body adorned with jewels and pearls in golden tones, in the center there is a dagger and a heart, while on her head has a very resplendent crown.

Promotion
Thalía appeared on The Tonight Show Starring Jimmy Fallon on May 11, 2021, as a special musical guest to promote the album which included the premiere of the music video for the album's fourth single Mojito. A week later on May 18, 2021, Thalía appeared as a special guest on The Today Show to talk about the album and promote it some more.

Track listing

Accolades
The album was nominated for Pop Album of the Year at Premios Lo Nuestro.

References

2021 albums
Thalía albums
Sony Music Latin albums